R. Horton (full name and dates of birth and death unknown) was an English cricketer.  Horton's batting style is unknown, but it is known he was a slow left-arm orthodox bowler.

Horton made his first-class debut for Gloucestershire against Lancashire in 1925.  He made two further first-class appearances, both in 1925, against Nottinghamshire and Leicestershire.  In his three first-class matches, he scored 13 runs at an average of 4.33, with a high score of 7.  With the ball, he took just a single wicket.

References

External links
R. Horton at ESPNcricinfo
R. Horton at CricketArchive

English cricketers
Gloucestershire cricketers
Year of birth missing
Year of death missing
Place of birth missing